Saccocalyx may refer to:
 Saccocalyx (plant), a genus of flowering plant in the family Lamiaceae
 Saccocalyx (sponge), a genus of animals in the family Euplectellidae